Orange Park Acres is an unincorporated community surrounded by the City of Orange in Orange County, California. Orange Park Acres is bordered by Santiago Canyon Road to the north and Chapman Avenue to the South. Most residents in the area are upper-middle-class or wealthy. It has several equestrian areas, and many stables throughout the community. The area has one shopping center and is adjacent to Santiago Canyon College. The ZIP Code is 92869, and the community is inside area code 714.

History
Orange Park Acres was founded in 1928 as the official equestrian destination of Orange County. Much of that historical heritage can be observed through the lack of sidewalks and street lights in many areas, as well as the abundance of fenced horse trails.

The community was placed under mandatory evacuation during the Windy Ridge fire in 2007, a blaze that scorched the unincorporated areas surrounding Anaheim Hills and Orange Park Acres. In total, the blaze damaged 

and resulted in the scorching of over half the Weir Canyon Regional Park, as well as the evacuation of several homes in both Orange Park Acres and Anaheim Hills.

See also
 Orange Park Acres community association

References 

Unincorporated communities in Orange County, California
Unincorporated communities in California